Baran is the name of several rural localities in Russia.

Modern localities
Baran, Sudislavsky District, Kostroma Oblast, a selo in Sudislavskoye Settlement of Sudislavsky District in Kostroma Oblast;

Abolished localities
Baran, Mezhevskoy District, Kostroma Oblast, a settlement in Petushikhsky Selsoviet of Mezhevskoy District of Kostroma Oblast; abolished on October 6, 2004

References

Notes

Sources